The 2000 Alabama Crimson Tide football team represented the University of Alabama in the 2000 college football season. The team was led by head coach Mike DuBose, who was coaching his final season at the program. The team finished 6th in the SEC Western Division. The Crimson Tide, also known informally as the Tide, played their home games at Bryant–Denny Stadium, in Tuscaloosa, Alabama, and Legion Field, in Birmingham, Alabama.

The team entered the season trying to build upon a 10–3 record from their 1999 season, which included a 34–7 victory in the SEC Championship over the Florida Gators. The 2000 team would not have the same success. Despite a preseason #3 ranking they eventually finished with a 3–8 record (3–5 in the SEC). The 2000 season was filled with several close losses. A 30–28 loss at LSU was the Tide's first loss to LSU in Baton Rouge in 31 years, ending a 14–0–1 streak Alabama had posted there since 1969. A 9–0 defeat at the hands of in-state rival Auburn came on a cold and rainy afternoon and marked the first Iron Bowl played in Tuscaloosa since 1901.

For the first time since the 1956 season Alabama failed to win any out-of-conference games and became the first team from an AQ conference to lose to Central Florida, falling 38–40 at home on a last-second field goal. On November 1, Athletic Director Mal Moore announced that Mike DuBose would resign at the end of the season after one of the program's worst seasons.

Schedule

Source: Rolltide.com All-time Football Results: 2000 Season

Coaching staff

Rankings

Game summaries

UCLA

The Preseason hype at Alabama was through the roof as the reigning SEC Champions came into a match up against UCLA ranked third in the country. Despite that, Alabama was physically dominated by UCLA offense as they pulled off the upset.

Vanderbilt

Alabama would use an eighteen-point 4th quarter to pull away and beat Vanderbilt for the 16th straight time. This would be the last conference game Alabama would play at Legion Field.

Southern Miss

Alabama would be shut out for the first time since 1997 as Southern Miss used a pick six and a scoop and score to beat Alabama at Legion Field for the first time since 1990. After the game, Mike Dubose offered his resignation to Mal Moore but, was rejected by Moore.

Arkansas

Despite having the lead for the majority of the second half, Arkansas 13-play, 80-yard drive, capped off by a 9-yard touchdown pass from Robby Hamilton to Marcellus Poydras with 1:04 to go, gave Arkansas the lead and the eventual win.

South Carolina

Milos Lewis had two critical 4th quarter interceptions that allowed Alabama to hold on the beat #23 South Carolina. The win kept Alabama's perfect record against South Carolina all time (10–0).

Ole Miss

Alabama's 45 points are the most of any team in a game under Mike Dubose and the most for any Alabama team since 1993 in a rout of Ole Miss.

Tennessee

For the 6th year in a row, Tennessee found a way to beat Alabama extending their longest win streak against the Crimson Tide. This match up was the first time both teams came into the game not ranked since 1988.

UCF

Alabama could not overcome 5 turnovers as a Javier Beorlegui 37 yard field goal gave UCF the upset win on Homecoming for Alabama. This was the 2nd time under Mike Dubose that Alabama had lost its Homecoming game. On the Wednesday following the game, Mike Dubose was informed that he would not return as head coach in 2001. Coach Dubose was allowed to remain as head coach until the end of the season.

LSU

For the first time since 1969, Alabama lost at Tiger Stadium behind 16 fourth quarter points from LSU after Alabama had taken the lead at the beginning of the 4th quarter. Alabama scored with seven seconds left to cut the lead to two but, failed to recover the onside kick. This lost guaranteed Alabama second losing season under Mike Dubose and third since 1957.

Mississippi State

Alabama gave up a season high 538 total yards of total offense as Mississippi State beat Alabama for the third straight time in Starkville.

Auburn

For the first time since 1901, the Iron Bowl would be played in Tuscaloosa and the first time ever at Bryant Denny Stadium. However, freezing rain, sleet, and Damon Duval's three field goals would spoil the return as Auburn would shut out Alabama for the first time since 1987. This would be the last game for Mike Dubose as head coach and would be the last time to date Alabama has been shut out. This along with the Southern Miss shut out earlier in the season, would be the first time Alabama has been shut out more than once in a season since 1957.

References

Alabama
Alabama Crimson Tide football seasons
Alabama Crimson Tide football